The Ambassador of Australia to Turkey is an officer of the Australian Department of Foreign Affairs and Trade and the head of the Embassy of the Commonwealth of Australia to the Republic of Turkey. The ambassador resides in Ankara. Since 2011, non-resident accreditation has been held for Azerbaijan and Georgia, which were transferred from the Embassy in Moscow. The ambassador's work is assisted by a Consulate-General in Istanbul and a Consulate in Çanakkale (since 2006).

The current ambassador, since October 2021, is Miles Armitage.

List of ambassadors

Notes
 Also served as the non-resident Ambassador of Australia to Azerbaijan, since 2011.
 Also served as the non-resident Ambassador of Australia to Georgia, since 2011.

See also
 Australia–Turkey relations

References

External links
Australian Embassy – Turkey, Azerbaijan, Georgia

 
Turkey
Australia